Collings may refer to:

People
Collings (surname)

Places
Collings Lakes, New Jersey, area within parts of Buena Vista Township and Folsom Borough in Atlantic County, and Monroe Township, in Gloucester County, New Jersey, United States
Collingswood, New Jersey, Borough in Camden County, New Jersey, United States

Others
Collings Guitars
Collings Foundation, a private non-profit educational foundation dedicated to the preservation and public display of transportation-related history

See also
Collins (disambiguation)